The India national kabaddi team represents India in international men's kabaddi competitions. The team is by far the most successful national kabaddi side of any country, winning gold medals at the Asian Games in 1990 (the first year the sport was contested), 1994, 1998, 2002, 2006, 2010, and 2014, as well as winning all three Kabaddi World Cup events to date. Pardeep Narwal the current captain of the team (declared so in 2022) after Deepak Niwas Hooda (former captain) was suffering from bad form in PKL 9.

History

1990s 
Kabaddi was contested at the Asian Games as a competitive (non-exhibition) sport for the first time in 1990. India beat Bangladesh in the gold medal match for both the 1990 Asian Games and 1994 Asian Games. India lost to Pakistan in the 1993 South Asian Games gold medal match. In the 1998 Asian Games held in Bangkok, the team beat arch rivals Pakistan for the gold medal.

2000s 
India beat Bangladesh in the gold medal match of the 2002 Asian Games, held in Busan.

India won the inaugural Kabaddi World Cup in 2004, beating Iran by a 55–27 margin. They repeated the feat three years later, beating the Iranians 29–19.

At the 2006 Asian Games, India beat Pakistan 35–23 to win their fifth gold medal at the tournament.

2010s 
In the 2010 and 2014 Asian Games, India continued to dominate, winning gold on both occasions.

When the Kabaddi World Cup resumed again in 2016 after a nine-year hiatus, India beat Iran for the third final in a row by 38–29.

In 2017, India won the Asian Kabaddi Championship led by raider Ajay Thakur by defeating Pakistan in the final by 36–22.

India won the 2018 Dubai Kabaddi Masters tournament, beating Iran 44–26 in the final.

At the 2018 Asian Games, India lost to South Korea 23–24 in the group stages – this was the Indian team's first ever loss in their history at the Asian Games. Despite the loss, India qualified for the semi-finals, but lost 27–18 to Iran, who went on to win the gold.

India won the gold at the 2019 South Asian Games led by Deepak Niwas Hooda, beating Sri Lanka in the final by 51–18 with raider Naveen Kumar Goyat bagging a Super 10.

2020s 
The Indian team have not played in any tournaments since December 2019 due to the Covid-19 Pandemic.

Coaching staff

Results and fixtures

Competitive record

Asian Games

World Cup

Asian Kabaddi Championship

Circle World Cup

Circle Asian Cup

Asian Beach Games

Asian Indoor Games

South Asian Games

Dubai Kabaddi Masters

Captains

Current squad

Players
 Raju Bhavsar
 Randhir Singh Sehrawat
 Ram Mehar Singh
 Balwan Singh
 Ramesh Kumar
 Rakesh Kumar
 Anup Kumar
 Navneet Gautam
 Jasvir Singh
 Ajay Thakur
 Rahul Chaudhari
 Manjeet Chillar
 Mohit Chillar

References

External links
 

Kabaddi
National kabaddi teams
National kabaddi team